Mario Alfonso Bran (born 17 October 1989) is a Guatemalan race walker. He competed in the 50 km event at the 2016 Summer Olympics and finished 42nd. Bran placed second over 20 km at the Central American Race Walking Championships in 2012–14.

References

1989 births
Living people
Guatemalan male racewalkers
Olympic athletes of Guatemala
Athletes (track and field) at the 2016 Summer Olympics
Athletes (track and field) at the 2015 Pan American Games
Pan American Games competitors for Guatemala